The Quiksilver Pro Gold Coast 2018 was an event of the Association of Surfing Professionals for 2018 World Surf League.

This event was held from 11 to 22 March at Gold Coast, (Queensland, Australia) and contested by 36 surfers.

Round 1

Round 2

Round 3

Round 4

Quarter finals

Semi finals

Final

References

Surfing competitions
2018 World Surf League
2018 in Australian sport
Sport on the Gold Coast, Queensland
Quiksilver Pro Gold Coast